The 1980 Stowe Grand Prix was a men's tennis tournament played on outdoor hard courts at the Topnotch Inn in Stowe, Vermont in the United States that was part of the 1980 Grand Prix circuit. It was the third edition of the tournament and was held from August 11 through August 17, 1980. Unseeded Bob Lutz won the singles title.

Finals

Singles
 Bob Lutz defeated  Johan Kriek 6–3, 6–1
 It was Lutz' 2nd singles title of the year and the 8th of his career.

Doubles
 Bob Lutz /  Bernard Mitton defeated  Ilie Năstase/  Ferdi Taygan 6–4, 6–3

References

Stowe Grand Prix
Stowe Grand Prix